Antonino Casimiro Parrinello (born 2 October 1988) is an Italian former cyclist, who rode professionally between 2012 and 2017 for the ,  and  teams.

Major results

2009
 4th Gran Premio Industrie del Marmo
 4th Coppa della Pace
2010
 6th Gran Premio della Liberazione
 6th Ruota d'Oro
2011
 1st Ruota d'Oro
 1st GP Pretola
 1st Gara Ciclistica Millionaria
 1st GP Industria del Cuoio e delle Pelli
2013
 5th Grand Prix Impanis-Van Petegem
2014
 4th Roma Maxima
 5th Gran Premio della Costa Etruschi
 5th GP Industria & Artigianato di Larciano
 8th Giro dell'Appennino
 9th Memorial Marco Pantani
 10th Tre Valli Varesine
2015
 2nd Tour de Berne
 4th Overall Ronde de l'Oise
 4th Overall Sibiu Cycling Tour
 4th Trofeo Matteotti
 9th Gran Premio Nobili Rubinetterie
 9th Tre Valli Varesine
 10th Coppa Ugo Agostoni
2016
 1st  Overall Ronde de l'Oise
1st  Points classification
 1st Coupe des Carpathes
 6th Trofeo Matteotti
 6th Grand Prix Pino Cerami
2017
 1st GP Adria Mobil
 7th Trofeo Matteotti
 8th Overall Istrian Spring Trophy
 9th Overall Sibiu Cycling Tour
 9th Overall Ronde de l'Oise

References

External links

1988 births
Living people
Italian male cyclists
Sportspeople from the Province of Trapani
Cyclists from Sicily